Edita Janeliūnaitė (born 16 December 1988) is a road cyclist from Lithuania. She participated at the 2010 UCI Road World Championships, 2011 UCI Road World Championships and 2012 UCI Road World Championships.

References

1988 births
Lithuanian female cyclists
Living people
Place of birth missing (living people)